James Caskie (30 January 1914 – 19 May 1977) was a Scottish footballer, who played for St Johnstone, Everton, St Mirren (wartime guest), Hibernian (wartime guest), Rangers, Forfar Athletic and Berwick Rangers. Caskie represented Scotland in several unofficial wartime internationals. He also represented the Scottish League XI three times, one of which was during the war.

His son, also Jimmy, played for Clydebank.

References 

1914 births
1977 deaths
Footballers from Glasgow
Scottish footballers
Ashfield F.C. players
St Johnstone F.C. players
Everton F.C. players
Hibernian F.C. wartime guest players
Rangers F.C. players
Forfar Athletic F.C. players
Berwick Rangers F.C. players
Scottish Football League players
English Football League players
Scottish Football League representative players
Scottish Junior Football Association players
Association football wingers
Scotland wartime international footballers
St Mirren F.C. wartime guest players
Rangers F.C. wartime guest players
People from Possilpark